Leucania phragmitidicola (phragmites wainscot) is a species of moth of the family Noctuidae found in the eastern United States and Canada.

Description
Adult forewings are tan with streaks of gray and brown, paler veins, and a black discal spot. The pale vein that extend from the forewing base to the discal spot is edged in brown.

Range
The species' occurrence range extends from Oklahoma and Minnesota in the west to Florida and New Brunswick in the east. There are also scattered reports in the western United States.

Life cycle

Adults
Adults have been reported from February to November, with most sightings from April to October.

References 

Noctuinae
Moths described in 1852